New Jersey's 38th Legislative District is one of 40 districts that make up the map for the New Jersey Legislature. It covers the Bergen County municipalities of Bergenfield, Fair Lawn, Glen Rock, Hasbrouck Heights, Lodi, Maywood, New Milford, Oradell, Paramus, River Edge, Rochelle Park, and Saddle Brook and the Passaic County borough of Hawthorne.

Demographic information
As of the 2020 United States census, the district had a population of 227,451, of whom 179,126 (78.8%) were of voting age. The racial makeup of the district was 135,144 (59.4%) White, 9,698 (4.3%) African American, 640 (0.3%) Native American, 36,122 (15.9%) Asian, 35 (0.0%) Pacific Islander, 21,955 (9.7%) from some other race, and 23,857 (10.5%) from two or more races. Hispanic or Latino of any race were 48,582 (21.4%) of the population.

The district had 167,389 registered voters , of whom 66,063 (39.5%) were registered as unaffiliated, 62,412 (37.3%) were registered as Democrats, 37,105 (22.2%) were registered as Republicans, and 1,809 (1.1%) were registered to other parties.

Political representation
For the 2022–2023 session, the district is represented in the State Senate by Joseph Lagana (D, Paramus) and in the General Assembly by Lisa Swain (D, Fair Lawn) and Chris Tully (D, Bergenfield).

The legislative district overlaps with New Jersey's 5th and 9th congressional districts.

District composition since 1973
Since the creation of the 40-district legislative map in 1973, the 38th District has always included Paramus, though early in the lifetime of the 40-district map, Hackensack was also within the district. In the 1973 version of the map, and in the decade following the 1981 redistricting, Paramus and Hackensack anchored the 38th District with numerous nearby municipalities in central Bergen County compromising the remainder of the district. In the 1991 redistricting, the 38th became more of a crescent shape stretching from Cliffside Park and Palisades Park, northwest to Elmwood Park, then north and east to Paramus and Oradell. This shape was slightly modified in 2001 when that year's redistricting extended the 38th to the Hudson River picking up Fort Lee and Edgewater. The crescent shape of the district was removed in the 
2011 redistricting when it changed to a T-shaped district extending out of Bergen County for the first time.

In October 2015, Anthony Cappola left the race for an Assembly seat in the 38th District and resigned from office as a member of the River Edge Borough Council, following disclosures that he had written and published a 2003 book titled Outrageous that was described as "full of racial slurs, rants and stereotypes". The Bergen County Republican Organization filed suit in Passaic County, seeking to replace Cappola's spot on the ballot with Fernando Alonso and offering to cover the $100,000 cost of reprinting ballots. Bergen County Clerk John Hogan argued that absentee ballots had already been printed and distributed, with nearly ballots already completed and submitted to the Clerk's Office. The Republicans unexpectedly dropped the effort to have the candidate replaced on October 13 and Cappola later announced his intention to continue in the race. Ultimately Cappola and his running mate Mark DiPisa were defeated by Democratic incumbents Tim Eustace and Joseph Lagana.

All three seats became vacant in 2018. Robert M. Gordon resigned his Senate seat on April 4, 2018, to accept an appointment to the New Jersey Board of Public Utilities. Democratic committee members in Bergen and Passaic Counties unanimously selected Assemblyman Lagana over Assemblyman Eustace (after the latter withdrew to back Lagana) to replace Gordon in the Senate on April 11; he took his Senate seat on April 12. The following day on April 13, Eustace resigned his seat to become deputy director of the North Jersey District Water Supply Commission. Committee members selected Fair Lawn Mayor Lisa Swain and Congressional aide and former Bergenfield Council President Chris Tully as the replacements in the Assembly; they were sworn in on May 24.

Election history

Election results

Senate

General Assembly

References

Bergen County, New Jersey
Passaic County, New Jersey
38